The Prussian Cultural Heritage Foundation (SPK) is a German federal government body that oversees 27 museums and cultural organizations in and around Berlin, Germany. Its purview includes all of Berlin's State Museums, the Berlin State Library, the Prussian Privy State Archives and a variety of institutes and research centers. As such, it is one of the largest cultural organizations in the world, and also the largest cultural employer in Germany with around 2,000 staff as of 2020. More than four million people visited its museums in 2019.

The SPK was established in 1957 with the mission to acquire and preserve the cultural legacy of the former State of Prussia. Its current operations include the preservation and care of the museum collections and the continuation of academic and scientific research to encourage learning and understanding between different peoples.

In July 2020, Federal Government Commissioner for Culture and the Media Monika Grütters announced that the SPK would be dissolved and converted into four independent foundations: State Museums, State Library, Secret State Archives and Ibero-American Institute. This followed recommendations by the Science Council that the SPK was too unwieldy in its current form. As a result, a reform commission has been set up consisting of representatives from the federal government, several German states, the SPK Presidium and museum directors to implement the dissolution by 2025.

Founding
During World War II, the cultural artifacts and fine arts in Prussia, especially in Berlin, came under increasing threat of loss. To protect them from Allied bombing, millions of items were evacuated to relative safety in monasteries, castles and abandoned mines around Germany starting in 1941. With the collapse of the Third Reich in 1945, many of these collections wound up damaged, destroyed, or variously hidden in the Allied occupation zones. All the former Prussian institutions ceased to officially exist when the State of Prussia was abolished in 1947, placing these assets in further doubt. As Germany became divided into West and East, what remained of the buildings and scattered collections were also separated by the Iron Curtain.

The Prussian Cultural Heritage Foundation began in 1957 by a West German constitutional mandate to find and preserve the collections still stored throughout the former western occupation zones. In 1961, efforts began to move these materials to West Berlin. From the mid-1960s onward, a series of Modernist buildings were constructed at the Kulturforum to serve as new homes for the collections, including the Gemäldegalerie, the Neue Nationalgalerie and the Berlin State Library. Upon German Reunification in 1990, the Foundation's role expanded considerably to encompass many of the most important cultural properties of the former East Germany. The most important tasks today are in the consolidation of collections, reconstruction of physical space, conservation-restoration and Provenance research.

Dissolution
In 2018, Minister of State for Culture and Media Monika Grütters appointed a panel which was commissioned with a report on the future of the Foundation. By 2020, the panel proposed dissolving the Foundation and instead creating four separate foundations with separate management: one to oversee the Berlin state museums, one for the Staatsbibliothek (State Library), another for the Geheime Staatsarchiv (Secret State Archive) and a fourth for the Ibero-Amerikanisches Institut (Iberian-American Institute). It also proposed reorganising the foundation’s finances.

Buildings

In 1980 the Foundation's headquarters moved into a historic building at Von-der-Heydt-Straße 16. The Villa Von Der Heydt was built between 1860 and 1862 in neo-renaissance style by the architect Hermann Ende for Baron August von der Heydt, who was Minister of Finance under Otto von Bismarck in the last Prussian cabinet before the founding of the German Empire in 1871.

After Von der Heydt's death in 1874 the building became home to the first Chinese ambassador to Wilhelm II, who decorated its splendid rooms with valuable works of art. In 1938 the villa was bought by the Nazi government and used as an official residence by Hans Lammers, Cabinet Minister in the Reich Chancellery.

The house was severely damaged in World War II, with only the basement and the outer walls remaining. In the immediate post-war years it was occupied by a sweets factory and an illicit still. The villa's gloomy ruins also once formed the backdrop for a spy film. It was not until 1971 that plans for reconstruction of the building began under the aegis of the German Federal Buildings Authority. Renovations completed in 1980.

The Foundation has since expanded operations to a new office building at Von-der-Heydt-Straße 16.

Institutions administered
The Heritage Foundation has overall responsibility for the following institutions and facilities:

Berlin State Museums
Altes Museum
Alte Nationalgalerie
Bode-Museum
Ethnological Museum of Berlin
Friedrichswerder Church
Gemäldegalerie, Berlin
Hamburger Bahnhof
Kupferstichkabinett Berlin
Museum of Asian Art
Museum Berggruen
Museum of Decorative Arts
Museum Europäischer Kulturen
Museum of Photography
Museum Scharf-Gerstenberg
Neues Museum
Neue Nationalgalerie
Pergamon Museum
Museum Agencies
Central Archive of the Berlin State Museums
Center for Provenance Research
Kunstbibliothek Berlin
Rathgen Research Laboratory
Replica Works (Gipsformerei)
Berlin State Library
Haus Unter Den Linden
Haus Potsdamer Straße
Haus Westhafen
Prussian Heritage Image Archive
Coordination Office for the Preservation of the Written Cultural Heritage
Prussian Privy State Archives
 Research Institutes
Ibero-American Institute
Institute for Museum Research
State Institute for Music Research
Berlin Musical Instrument Museum

Awards
The foundation awards the annual Felix Mendelssohn Bartholdy Prize to the winner of a competition between the best students from Germany's conservatories. Each year a different instrument is chosen.

The Ernst Waldschmidt Prize is awarded every five years for academically valuable achievements in the field of Indology, in particular in the fields in which Waldschmidt himself specialized: Buddhism, Indian and Central Asian archaeology and art.

Since 2004, the Foundation sponsors positions for the Voluntary Social Year in Culture ( or FSJ), a program of National Service for teenagers and young adults who meet certain educational requirements. There is a position each at the Directorate-General of the Berlin State Museums, Ibero-American Institute, Berlin State Library and the Central Archive of the Berlin State Museums.

The Heritage Foundation also awards scholarships for one- to three-month research and work residencies in Berlin. The scholarships are primarily intended to enable foreign scholars to work at the museums, libraries and archives and make professional contacts with staff.

Hermann Parzinger, President of the Prussian Cultural Heritage Foundation, co-chairs the German/American Provenance Research Exchange Program (PREP) for Museum Professionals for 2017-2019.

List of presidents

 1967–1977:  Hans-Georg Wormit
 1977–1998:  Werner Knopp
 1999–2008:  Klaus-Dieter Lehmann
 Since 2008:  Hermann Parzinger

See also
Humboldt Box
Prussian Palaces and Gardens Foundation Berlin-Brandenburg

References

External links
Prussian Cultural Heritage Foundation website

 
Organisations based in Berlin
1957 establishments in West Germany
Organizations established in 1957
Cultural organisations based in Germany